The canton of Nort-sur-Erdre is an administrative division of the Loire-Atlantique department, western France. Its borders were modified at the French canton reorganisation which came into effect in March 2015. Its seat is in Nort-sur-Erdre.

It consists of the following communes:
 
Casson
Le Cellier
Héric
Joué-sur-Erdre
Ligné
Mouzeil
Nort-sur-Erdre
Notre-Dame-des-Landes
Petit-Mars
Riaillé
Saint-Mars-du-Désert
Teillé
Les Touches
Trans-sur-Erdre

References

Cantons of Loire-Atlantique